The 1907–08 Dartmouth men's ice hockey season was the 3rd season of play for the program.

Season
With only one of the four founders of the program left (Warren Foote) the hockey team wasn't able to sustain the success they found in their second season and finished with a 1–5–1 record.

Note: Dartmouth College did not possess a moniker for its athletic teams until the 1920s, however, the university had adopted 'Dartmouth Green' as its school color in 1866.

Roster

Standings

Schedule and Results

|-
!colspan=12 style=";" | Regular Season

References

Dartmouth Big Green men's ice hockey seasons
Dartmouth
Dartmouth
Dartmouth
Dartmouth